Bisila África Bokoko Toichoa (born June 26, 1974) is a Spanish-born American businesswoman, entrepreneur, speaker and philanthropist. She is the founder and CEO of BBES, a New York-based business development agency that represents, promotes and markets brands internationally. Prior to starting her company, she held the position of executive director of the Spain-US Chamber of Commerce in New York City from 2005 to 2012.

Personal life and education 
Bokoko is a native of Valencia, Spain. Her family roots stemmed from the Bubi people in Malabo, Equatorial Guinea. In a Huffington Post article of January 2015, she says: "I am a cultural hybrid. I was born in Spain to African parents, became an American citizen and have been living in New York City for the last fifteen years."

Bokoko attended Universidad San Pablo, Madrid, Spain where she earned an MBA in Business Administration and Economics in 1998. That same year, Bokoko earned a certificate of British Law at the University of Manchester and completed a MA in International Relations at the City College of New York in 2003.

Career 
Bokoko started her career in 1997 as a legal assistant at Carbo & Martinez Law firm in Valencia, Spain. From 1999 to 2005, Bokoko was the Director of IVEX, the Valencia Institute of Export, where she helped Spanish businesses ranging from food, lifestyle goods to beverages and spirits enter the US market. Bisila Bokoko operated as the Executive Director of the Spain-US Chamber of Commerce from 2005 to 2012.

In 2010, she launched Bisila Wines, an international wine brand made in Spain. In 2012, she opened BBES, a New York-based global business development agency. The firm consults businesses in the fields of fashion, lifestyle, arts and culture. In December 2019, Bokoko was featured in the Visual Collaborative Polaris catalog, under the Supernova series for humanities, she was interviewed alongside people such as; Nse Ikpe-Etim, William Coupon and Nere Teriba.

Speaker
Bokoko is a business and motivational speaker represented by the Washington Speakers Bureau along with the likes of former US and French Presidents George W. Bush and Nicolas Sarkozy.

In October 2014, she co-hosted UNCTAD’s EMPRETEC Women in Business Awards (E-WBA) ceremony in Geneva, Switzerland during the World Investment Forum. Bokoko serves as a Spokesperson for Pikolinos, Agatha Ruiz de la Prada and The Liceu Barcelona Opera House US Foundation.

Philanthropy
In 2009, Bokoko founded BBALP (Bisila Bokoko African Literacy Project), a nonprofit organization headquartered in New York City. With current presence in Ghana, Kenya, Zimbabwe and Uganda. BBALP is committed to promoting literacy across the continent through the opening of libraries. The motto is : “with a book, you are never alone”.

On 17 April 2013, Bokoko hosted the Pikolinos Maasai Gala at the United Nations in collaboration to support the Kenyan tribe. Through the Maasai Project, over 1,600 Maasai women hand embroider leather onto Pikolinos shoes and bags, enabling them to earn a stable income while preserving their cultural heritage and way of life.

She is an advisory board member of United Nations EMPRETEC Women Programs fostering entrepreneurship skills among women in Latin America, Africa and the Middle East.

References

1974 births
Living people
Spanish emigrants to the United States
People with acquired American citizenship
Spanish people of Equatoguinean descent
American people of Equatoguinean descent
Spanish people of Bubi descent
American people of Bubi descent
City College of New York alumni
21st-century Spanish businesswomen
21st-century Spanish businesspeople
21st-century American businesswomen
21st-century American businesspeople
African-American women in business
Spanish philanthropists
American women philanthropists
21st-century African-American women
20th-century African-American women
20th-century African-American people